Milan Jeger (27 July 1931 – 29 October 2007) was a Yugoslav swimmer. He competed in two events at the 1960 Summer Olympics.

References

External links
 

1931 births
2007 deaths
Bosnia and Herzegovina male swimmers
Yugoslav male swimmers
Olympic swimmers of Yugoslavia
Swimmers at the 1960 Summer Olympics
Sportspeople from Sarajevo
Swimmers at the 1959 Mediterranean Games